Midway, Tennessee may refer to the following places in the U.S. state of Tennessee:
Midway, Bedford County, Tennessee, an unincorporated community
Midway, Cannon County, Tennessee, an unincorporated community
Midway, Clay County, Tennessee, an unincorporated community
Midway, Cocke County, Tennessee, an unincorporated community
Midway, Crockett County, Tennessee, an unincorporated community
Midway, Cumberland County, Tennessee, an unincorporated community
Midway, DeKalb County, Tennessee, an unincorporated community
Midway, Dyer County, Tennessee, an unincorporated community
Midway, Franklin County, Tennessee, an unincorporated community
Midway, Greene County, Tennessee, an unincorporated community
Midway, Hawkins County, Tennessee, an unincorporated community
Midway (north), Henry County, Tennessee, an unincorporated community
Midway (south), Henry County, Tennessee, an unincorporated community
Midway, Johnson County, Tennessee, an unincorporated community
Midway, Knox County, Tennessee, an unincorporated community
Midway, Morgan County, Tennessee, an unincorporated community
Midway, Obion County, Tennessee, an unincorporated community
Midway, Pickett County, Tennessee, an unincorporated community
Midway, Roane County, Tennessee, an unincorporated community
Midway, Warren County, Tennessee, an unincorporated community
Midway, Washington County, Tennessee, an unincorporated community